George T. Ross (November 3, 1949 – May 20, 2020) was an American politician from Massachusetts.

Ross was born in Pawtucket, Rhode Island and went to the Pawtucket Public Schools. He served in the United States Army during the Vietnam War. Ross studied culinary arts at Johnson & Wales University in Providence, Rhode Island. He owned and operated a restaurant in Attleboro, Massachusetts. He was a member of the Massachusetts House of Representatives for the 2nd Bristol district and a member of the Attleboro, Massachusetts City Council. Ross was a Republican.

References

1949 births
2020 deaths
Massachusetts city council members
Republican Party members of the Massachusetts House of Representatives
People from Attleboro, Massachusetts
Politicians from Pawtucket, Rhode Island
Military personnel from Rhode Island
American chefs
Johnson & Wales University alumni